The Udachnaya pipe (literally lucky pipe) is a diamond deposit in the Daldyn-Alakit kimberlite field in Sakha Republic, Russia.

History
Udachnaya was discovered on 15 June 1955, just two days after the discovery of the diamond pipe Mir by Soviet geologist Vladimir Shchukin and his team.

The nearby settlement of Udachny is named for the deposit.

, Udachnaya pipe is controlled by Russian diamond company Alrosa, which planned to halt open-pit mining in favor of underground mining in 2010. 

See also 
 Mir mine
 Volcanic pipe

References

External links

 Satellite photo of the Udachnaya pipe
 

Diamond mines in Russia
Diamond mines in the Soviet Union
Diatremes of Russia
Open-pit mines
Science and technology in the Soviet Union
Sakha Republic
Surface mines in Russia